Super Mario World is an animated television series based on the video game of the same name by Nintendo. It is the third animated series based on the Mario video game series. Thirteen episodes of the show were aired as part of a block with Captain N: The Game Master, called Captain N and the New Super Mario World, on NBC. The animation was provided by Pacific Rim Productions.

Synopsis
The animated series featured the same voice actors who had performed in The Adventures of Super Mario Bros. 3. However, unlike with its two predecessors, Toad is completely absent in this series (as he was absent in the Super Mario World game). An exclusive character not featured in the games called Oogtar, a clumsy caveboy, appears in his place (in which both characters were voiced by John Stocker) and Yoshi appears as one of the main characters in the show. Episodes mainly focused on the Mario Bros. dealing with schemes by King Koopa, and made use of new elements introduced by the video game within the story, though involvement of the "real world" was reduced to mere references for this series. Due to copyright restrictions, no licensed music was required for this show, leaving the show completely untouched for syndication and home media releases. Certain episodes of the series were created to meet the newly implemented guidelines set forth by the Children's Television Act.

Notably, Super Mario World is the only installment in the Mario cartoon trilogy that has been released on home media without any edits to the soundtrack. 

Throughout each of the three series, various episodes feature brief, dialogue-free action sequences that have a song playing over them. In the original broadcast versions of the first two series, these were in-house covers of actual popular songs from artists such as Michael Jackson and Milli Vanilli. Due to copyright issues, these songs were later replaced with generic background music in reruns and home video releases. 

Unlike its predecessors, however, the songs featured in Super Mario World'''s action sequences were original tracks that were written exclusively for the series.

Voice cast
 Walker Boone as Mario
 Tony Rosato as Luigi
 Andrew Sabiston as Yoshi
 Tracey Moore as Princess Toadstool
 Harvey Atkin as King Koopa
 Dan Hennessey as Bully Koopa
 James Rankin as Cheatsy Koopa
 Michael Stark as Kooky von Koopa
 Gordon Masten as Big Mouth Koopa
 Paulina Gillis as Kootie Pie Koopa
 Stuart Stone as Hip Koopa
 Tara Charendoff as Hop Koopa
 Catherine Gallant as Mama Fireplant
 John Stocker as Gophers, Koopa wizard, Wizardheimer, Oogtar
 Judy Marshak as minor characters

Episodes

Syndication
In 1992, after finishing its run on NBC, Super Mario World was included as part of the Captain N and the Video Game Masters syndication package by Rysher Entertainment.

Home media
In 1994, Buena Vista Home Video released a VHS tape under their DIC Toon-Time Video label, titled Super Mario Bros. Super Christmas Adventures!, which contained the episode The Night Before Cave Christmas.

In November 2007, Shout! Factory and Vivendi Entertainment released a Complete Series DVD set of Captain N and the New Super Mario World in Region 1, featuring all 13 original, uncut broadcast episodes. The series has also been released in Australia (Region 4) by MRA Entertainment.

NCircle Entertainment (under license from WildBrain) has also released the series in two volumes. They later released the complete series in one set (without Captain N episodes).

It is now available to stream on Paramount+.

 Legacy 
In 2006, after British satellite children's channel Pop began airing reruns of the series, the series gained a surge in popularity as being one of the major source materials for YouTube Poops alongside the other DIC Mario cartoons, video game Hotel Mario, Adventures of Sonic the Hedgehog'', and multiple games animated by Animation Magic. The show produced multiple internet memes, most notably "Mama Luigi", referencing Luigi's quote in the 1991 episode of the same name.

In 2017, 227 animators collaborated to reanimate "Mama Luigi" in their own styles. Each of the 255 total scenes featured a unique animation style. It was dedicated to the memories of Canadian actor Tony Rosato, who voiced Luigi, and Canadian actor Harvey Atkin, who voiced King Koopa.

References

External links
 

1990s American animated television series
1991 American television series debuts
1991 American television series endings
1991 Italian television series debuts
1991 Italian television series endings
American children's animated action television series
American children's animated adventure television series
American children's animated comedy television series
American children's animated musical television series
American children's animated fantasy television series
American television shows based on video games
Italian children's animated action television series
Italian children's animated adventure television series
Italian children's animated comedy television series
Italian children's animated fantasy television series
Animated series based on Mario
NBC original programming
Channel 4 original programming
Telecinco original programming
English-language television shows
Animated television series about brothers
Animated television series about dinosaurs
Television series by DIC Entertainment
Television series based on Mario
Film and television memes
Internet memes
Television shows filmed in Toronto
Television shows filmed in California